Eminent may refer to:

 Eminent Technology, an American audio electronics company
 Eminent BV, a Dutch organ manufacturer
 , a Royal Navy tugboat

See also 

 Eminence (disambiguation)
 Eminent domain, the power of a state to take private property for public use
 Eminent Lives, a biography series
 Ranking, a relationship between a set of items